Cordyla is a genus of fungus gnats in the family Mycetophilidae. There are at least 30 described species in Cordyla.

Species
These 39 species belong to the genus Cordyla:

C. bergensis (Barendrecht, 1938) c g
C. bicornuta (Landrock, 1926) c g
C. bidenticulata Sasakawa & Ishizaki, 2003 c g
C. bomloensis Kjaerandsen & Kurina, 2004 c g
C. borealisa Wu & Zheng, 2000 c g
C. borneoensis Kurina, 2005 c g
C. brevicornis (Staeger, 1840) c g
C. confera Garrett, 1925 i c g
C. crassicornis Meigen, 1818 c g
C. crassipalpis Dufour, 1839 c g
C. fasciata Meigen, 1830 c g
C. festiva (Costa, 1957) c g
C. fissa Edwards, 1925 c g
C. flaviceps (Staeger, 1840) c g
C. fusca Meigen, 1804 c g
C. geminata Sasakawa, 2005 c g
C. gracilis Fisher, 1938 i c g
C. insons Lastovka & Matile, 1974 c g
C. jani Kurina, 2005 c g
C. manca Johannsen, 1912 i c g b
C. monegrensis Chandler & Blasco-Zumeta, 2001 c g
C. murina Winnertz, 1863 c g
C. neglecta Johannsen, 1912 i c g
C. nitens Winnertz, 1863 c g
C. nitidula Edwards, 1925 c g
C. orientalis Sevcik, 2001 c g
C. parva Garrett, 1925 i c g
C. parvipalpis Edwards, 1925 c g
C. pusilla Edwards, 1925 i c g
C. recens Johannsen, 1912 i c g
C. scita Johannsen, 1912 i c g
C. scutellata Garrett, 1925 c g
C. semiflava (Staeger, 1840) c g
C. sixi (Barendrecht, 1938) c g
C. styliforceps (Bukowski, 1934) c g
C. toraia Kurina, 2005 c g
C. verio Garrett, 1925 i c g
C. vitiosa Winnertz, 1863 c g
C. volucris Johannsen, 1909 i c g

Data sources: i = ITIS, c = Catalogue of Life, g = GBIF, b = Bugguide.net

References

Further reading

 

Mycetophilidae
Articles created by Qbugbot
Nematocera genera